Lázaro Darcourt Martínez, sometimes spelled as Lázaro Dalcourt (born 25 April 1971) is a Cuban retired footballer.

Club career
Nicknamed el Pindi, Darcourt played his entire career for local side Pinar del Río, except for half a season in Germany with Bonner SC, when then Cuban leader Fidel Castro approved for the whole Cuban team to join the German 4th level side for part of the 1998/99 season. He also had a one month-trial with Olympique Marseille along with compatriot Osmín Hernández in 1998, only for a Cuban official to prevent him to sign professional terms.

Born in Candelaria, then in Pinar del Río Province, he won 5 Cuban league titles and was voted Cuban footballer of the year in 1991, 1992 and 1995.

International career
One of the leading players of the Cuban team during the 1990s, he made his international debut for Cuba in 1995 and has earned a total of 73 caps, scoring 21 goals. He represented his country in 15 FIFA World Cup qualification matches (6 goals) and played at 3 CONCACAF Gold Cup final tournaments.

His final international was a July 2003 CONCACAF Gold Cup match against the United States, quitting international football due to a persistent knee injury.

International goals
Scores and results list Cuba's goal tally first.

References

External links
 

1971 births
Living people
People from Pinar del Río Province
People from Artemisa Province
Association football midfielders
Cuban footballers
Cuba international footballers
1998 CONCACAF Gold Cup players
2002 CONCACAF Gold Cup players
2003 CONCACAF Gold Cup players
FC Pinar del Río players
Bonner SC players
Cuban expatriate footballers
Expatriate footballers in Germany
Cuban expatriate sportspeople in Germany